Carlos Eleodoro Juárez (born 29 June 1938), is an Argentine chess player, Argentine Chess Championship winner (1969).

Biography
Carlos Eleodoro Juárez participated in the Argentine Chess Championship finals, achieving his best result in 1969 by sharing second place with Raimundo García and winning an additional match 2½–½. In the 1971 Argentine Championship he shared 2nd–3rd place.

Carlos Eleodoro Juárez played for Argentina in the Chess Olympiad:
 In 1970, at second reserve board in the 19th Chess Olympiad in Siegen (+1, =1, -1).

Carlos Eleodoro Juárez was participant of the Zonal Chess Tournament in 1972, Pan American Chess Championships and major international chess tournaments held in South America.

References

External links

Carlos Eleodoro Juárez chess games at 365chess.com

1938 births
Living people
Argentine chess players
Chess Olympiad competitors